David W. Krogmann (1934 – January 22, 2016) was an American biologist and a professor of biochemistry at Purdue University. He is known for his work in photosynthesis in chloroplasts and cyanobacteria.

He discovered the Orange Carotenoid Protein of cyanobacteria in 1981 and helped solve its crystal structure.

References 

1934 births
2016 deaths
Purdue University faculty
American biologists